Korukanti Chandar Patel (born 23 September 1972) is an elected representative from Ramagundam constituency in the Telangana Legislative Assembly. In the 2018 Telangana Assembly elections, he defeated his nearest rival, Somarapu Satyanarayana, by a margin of 26,090 votes. He played an important role during the late 2000s Telangana Separate State Movement spearheaded by now-CM, K.Chandrashekar Rao, conducting a 48 km Telangana Saadhana Padyatra and subsequently spending 45 days in judicial custody.

Early life 
Korukanti Chandar was born on 23 September 1972, the second child of Lakshmi and Mallaiah.
He is an MA Political Science graduate.

Political life 
He was the general Secretary of the Telugu Yuvatha in Godavarikhani between 1993 and 1997 and later in Ramagundam from 1997-99.
He joined the Telangana Rashtra Samithi in 2001 upon Koppula Eshwar's advice and soon took up the reins of spearheading the separate state movement in Ramagundam and surrounding districts.

References 

Telangana politicians
1972 births
Living people
Telugu politicians
Telangana MLAs 2018–2023